The 1960 Illinois Fighting Illini football team was an American football team that represented the University of Illinois during the 1960 Big Ten Conference football season. In their first year under head coach Pete Elliott, the Illini compiled a 5–4 record and finished in a three-way tie for fifth place in the Big Ten Conference. Tackle Joe Rutgens was selected as the team's most valuable player.

Schedule

References

Illinois
Illinois Fighting Illini football seasons
Illinois Fighting Illini football